HRM may refer to:
 Ḥ-R-M, a Semitic root
 Croatian Navy
 Halifax Regional Municipality, Nova Scotia, Canada
 Harrietsham railway station,  England, station code
 Hassi R'Mel Airport,  Algeria, IATA code
 Heart Rhythm Meditation
 Hermes Airlines, a Greek airline, ICAO code
 High-reactivity metakaolin, used in cement
 High Resolution Melt, in molecular biology 
 High resolution manometry, a medical diagnostic system
 His or Her Royal Majesty
 Horned Miao language, spoken in China, ISO 639-3 code
 Horsham railway station, Victoria, Australia, station code
 Human Race Machine, a computerized console
 Human resource management